Jonas van Kerckhoven (born 4 February 1994) is a Belgian footballer who plays as a defensive midfielder for Royal Cappellen.

References

External links
 
 

1994 births
Living people
Belgian footballers
Eredivisie players
Willem II (football club) players
Sportkring Sint-Niklaas players
K.F.C. Eendracht Zele players
S.C. Eendracht Aalst players
Royal Cappellen F.C. players
People from Bornem
Association football midfielders
Footballers from Antwerp Province
Belgian expatriate sportspeople in the Netherlands
Belgian expatriate footballers
Expatriate footballers in the Netherlands